Duke Ligong of Qin (died 443 BC) was from 476 to 443 BC the 22nd ruler of the Zhou Dynasty Chinese state of Qin that eventually united China to become the Qin Dynasty.  His ancestral name was Ying (嬴), and Duke Ligong was his posthumous title.  Duke Ligong succeeded his father Duke Dao of Qin, who died in 477 BC, as ruler of Qin.

In 461 BC, Duke Ligong dispatched an army of 20,000 men to attack the Rong state of Dali (in present-day Dali County, Shaanxi), and captured its capital.

In 456 BC, the State of Jin attacked Qin, taking the city of Wucheng (武城, in present-day Hua County, Shaanxi).

In 453 BC, the Zhao, Han, and Wei clans of Jin jointly attacked Zhi, the most powerful of Jin's four major clans, killed its leader Zhi Yao, and divided the territory of Zhi amongst themselves.  The state of Jin was effectively partitioned into three new states.  Some of the survivors of the Zhi clan fled to Qin.

In 444 BC, Qin attacked Yiqu (in present-day Ning County, Gansu), another Rong state, and captured its king.

Duke Ligong reigned for 34 years and died in 443 BC.  He was succeeded by his son Duke Zao of Qin.

References

Year of birth unknown
Rulers of Qin
5th-century BC Chinese monarchs
443 BC deaths